Founded in 1993, ESTsoft is a South Korean application software  development company. Its software ranges from desktop to business software for enterprises.

Products
There are several products marketed under the "ALTools" product line. In Korea, "Al" means "egg", and numerous products under this category have egg-themed icons and mascots. ALTools products include:

ALZip - A compression and archiving utility, supporting several archiving formats, including ISO
ALFTP - An FTP client and server 
ALSee - An image viewer and photo editor 
ALPass - A password manager for web sites (update service end)
ALGIF - A GIF animation program (update end)
ALSong - An MP3 player which supports online content
ALShow - A media player 
ALMap - A family of digital map viewers and GPS (both software and hardware) (update end) 
ALX - Digital rights management software
ALToolbar - A toolbar for Internet Explorer 
ALYac - An antivirus based on BitDefender engine

Other ESTsoft products include:

InternetDISK - Online storage solution 
iDisk - A version of InternetDISK designed for ISPs to host larger amounts of data 
iMan - Instant Messaging software 
Cabal Online - A Massive Multiplayer Online Role Playing Game
Cabal 2 - A Massive Multiplayer Online Role Playing Game
HeroesGo (also known as Howling Sword) - A Massive Multiplayer Online Role Playing Game that has similar core gameplay to DFO/Rusty Hearts/Elsword

References

External links
 ESTsoft site

 
Companies established in 1993
Software companies of South Korea
South Korean brands